The Comptoir Commercial Congolais was a concession company of the Congo Free State, which was in personal union with Leopold II of Belgium.

References

Bibliography

Belgian colonisation in Africa
History of the Democratic Republic of the Congo
Congo Free State